Fitzroy Bay is a bay close to the entrance of Wellington Harbour in New Zealand. It lies to the southeast of the entrance to the harbour, between Pencarrow Head (to the north) and Baring Head (to the south).

The bay has been the site of several shipwrecks, predominantly caused by the strong winds and swells which run through Cook Strait.

References

Bays of the Wellington Region
Cook Strait